Ecdemus obscuratus is a moth of the subfamily Arctiinae. It was described by Schaus in 1911. It is found in Costa Rica and Honduras.

References

Arctiinae
Moths described in 1911